Dennis Miller (born 1953) is an American comedian, television and radio personality.

Dennis Miller Live, (1994–2002) weekly talk show on HBO, hosted by (the above) comedian Dennis Miller
 
Dennis Miller may also refer to:  

Dennis Miller (Australian actor) (born 1937–2022), Australian actor
Denny Miller, (1934–2014) American actor 
Dennis Miller (ice hockey) (born 1969), ice hockey player and coach
Dennis Miller (Paralympian), New Zealand Paralympic athlete
Dennis Miller (American football), American football coach

See also
Denis Miller (1918–2009), New Zealand pilot
Dennis Millar (disambiguation)
Dennis Miller Bunker (1861–1890), American painter